Angadenia berteroi, the pineland golden trumpet, is a plant species in the family Apocynaceae, first described in 1844. It is native to Florida (Monroe + Dade Counties), North Carolina (Washington County), Bahamas, Cuba, Hispaniola, and the Turks & Caicos Islands.

References

External links
US Department of Agriculture Plant Profile
Institute for Regional Conservation, Floristic Inventory of South Florida
Gardening Europe

Echiteae
Flora of the Southeastern United States
Flora of the Caribbean
Plants described in 1844